Boyoz is a Turkish pastry of Sephardic Jewish origin, associated with İzmir, Turkey, which is practically the only city where it is prepared for commercial purposes and follows the original recipe. As such, in the eyes of Smyrniots boyoz became a symbol of their hometown or of their longing for it when away. The most widely preferred boyoz is plain, without addition of meat or cheese or spinach stuffings, and as cooked by a handful of master boyoz bakers in İzmir.

Boyoz paste is a mixture of flour, sunflower oil and a small amount of tahini. It is kneaded by hand and the ball of paste is left to rest for two hours. The paste is then flattened to the width of a dish and left to rest again. It is then kneaded and opened once more, before being formed into a roll and left to repose as such for a further period of several hours. When the tissue of the paste is still soft but about to detach into pieces, it is cut into small balls and put in rows of small pans and marinated in vegetable oil between half an hour and one hour. The paste then takes an oval form and acquires the consistency of a millefeuille. The small balls can then be put on a tray into a very high-temperature oven either in plain form or with fillings of cheese or spinach added inside.

The usual accompaniments for boyoz are dark tea and hard-boiled eggs generously sprinkled with black pepper. Boyoz is generally consumed outdoors, purchased from street vendors.

Origin
Virtually all sources agree on the Judeo-Spanish roots of boyoz. It is a contribution to İzmir's urban culture by Sephardic Jews who were evicted from Spain after 1492 and who settled in large numbers in a number of prominent Ottoman cities of the period, among which İzmir stood out as one of the primary destinations. These explanations on the roots of boyoz are confirmed by the presence of a very similar pastry in the culinary traditions of such other offshoots of Spanish culture as Argentina, Chile, Peru and Mexico, where bollos are common especially in the diet of Sephardic Jews, usually with cheese and spinach fillings. In Renaissance Spanish and the Ladino language, bollos means "a bundle, a pack".

Until recently, all master bakers who prepared boyoz in İzmir were Jewish, and the present masters have all been trained by Avram Usta, whose name is echoed to this day in the commercial slogans adopted by some of these bakers, who market the "Boyoz of Avram Usta".

See also

 Bollos
 List of pastries

Citations

General and cited sources 
 Trademark Tastes of Izmir

İzmir
Jewish baked goods
Jewish cuisine
Sephardi Jewish cuisine
Jews and Judaism in İzmir
Turkish pastries
Turkish words and phrases